VAN HØF (formerly VanLadyLove) is an American Indie Rock / Pop / Alternative band from Provo, Utah.  The band also has roots in Arizona, California and Utah. VanLadyLove was formed in 2012. Their first live show was opening for the band Parachute, after which they quickly gained a local following in Utah, which has begun to spread throughout the United States and Europe. VanLadyLove has opened for other prominent acts like Train, Portugal the Man, The Avett Brothers, Cold War Kids, Blink 182, Zella Day, Coasts, Tyrone Wells, Cody Simpson, Tyler Ward, and Dave Barnes.

VanLadyLove won the “#1 Artist on the Verge 2014” award, a national honor given by a team of top A&R scouts, talent buyers, booking agents, media taste-makers and other industry experts at the New Music Seminar's in New York City.

Former members of VanLadyLove include Travis Van Hoff (Vocals), Jordan Clark (Guitar), Steele Saldutti (Bass), and Chris Petty (Drums), Caleb Loveless, Christopher White, and John Buckner.

Towards the end of 2017 guitarist Jordan Clark left and the remaining three rebranded themselves as VAN HØF, most likely a reference to the last name of the lead vocalist Travis Van Hoff. They claimed that this was to help transition their lineup, strategies, and goals.

The new group is made up of Travis Van Hoff (Vocals/Guitar/Keys), Steele Saldutti (Bass/Synthesizers), and Matt Wilson (Drummer).

The new band takes influence from bands such as Young the Giant, Cage the Elephant, Phantogram, The Black Keys, Coldplay, Radiohead, Imagine Dragon, Everything Everything, The Neighbourhood, and The Killers.

Their first album Love Matter was released February 17, 2014. The album received recognition very quickly after receiving key placements on national television. This, along with a viral music video for the song Neverland, triggered the band to chart on iTunes.

Major industry professionals noticed the buzz and invited VanLadyLove to participate in the New Music Seminar in New York City. They went on to become the New Music Seminar’s, 2014 Artist On the Verge. VanLadyLove was chosen for this award by a team of leading A&R scouts, talent buyers, booking agents, media taste-makers and other industry experts. As the year came to a close, the album was selected for VH1’s “Staff Picks of 2014” and received 2014 Utah Music Awards Best Pop Band and Best Album of the year.

Currently VAN HØF is recording their new album at Green Day’s Jingletown Studios in Oakland.

Album Listing for Love Matter 
 Alibi
 Bottle of Bad Ideas
 Don't Be Afraid
 Moves Me
 West Coast Dancer
 Neverland

References

Musical quartets